Tuvako Nathaniel Manongi is a Tanzanian diplomat who has served as the Permanent Representative of Tanzania to the United Nations since 19 September 2012.

References

Before joining the Permanent Mission of the United Republic of Tanzania in New York as Permanent Representative Ambassador Manongi served as principal officer at the United Nations in the Executive Office of Secretary General (EOSG) Ban Ki-moon under the Deputy Secretary General from 2007 - 2012.

Living people
Permanent Representatives of Tanzania to the United Nations
University of Dar es Salaam alumni
Centre for Foreign Relations alumni
Year of birth missing (living people)